Magnesium aspartate, the chelated magnesium salt of aspartic acid, it is a mineral supplement.

Chemical action
This form of magnesium supplementation has increased bioavailability compared to magnesium oxide and magnesium citrate. There were some promising clinical trials conducted in the 1960s that found a combination of magnesium and potassium aspartates had a positive effect on fatigue and they reduced muscle hyper-excitability.

In its evaluation in 2005, the AFC Panel concluded that in humans the bioavailability of magnesium from magnesium L-aspartate was similar to that from other organic magnesium salts and the more soluble inorganic magnesium salts. Overall, it was concluded that organic salts of magnesium have the greatest water solubility and demonstrate a greater oral absorption and bioavailability compared to less soluble magnesium preparations such as magnesium oxide, magnesium hydroxide, magnesium carbonate and magnesium sulphate.

Dosage

Adequate Intake (AI)

Magnesium-L-aspartate 1230 mg (magnesium 122 mg) up to 3 times/day
Dosage adjustment in renal impairment: Patients with severe kidney failure should not receive magnesium due to toxicity from accumulation.

Magnesium supplements and other magnesium containing products, such as antacids, can bind with prescription medicines, reducing their effectiveness.

Safety
When considering aspartate sources individually, the levels of exposure estimated in this opinion amount up to 6 g/day for calcium aspartate (equivalent to 100 mg/kg bw/day for a 60 kg individual), 5.8 g/day for magnesium aspartate (equivalent to 97 mg/kg bw/day), 4 g/day for potassium aspartate (equivalent to 67 mg/kg bw/day), 0.05 g/day for zinc aspartate (0.8 mg/kg bw/day) and 0.008 g/day for copper aspartate (0.1 mg/kg bw/day). These values are all below those reported to induce amino acid imbalance in intervention trials (6.3 g aspartate/day) and they are, respectively, 7, 7.2, 10.5, 875 and 7000 times lower than the NOAEL for aspartate identified from a 90-day rat study. Based on these margins of safety, the Panel concludes that the use of zinc and copper aspartate, as sources of zinc and copper at the proposed use levels, are not of safety concern but that the use of calcium, magnesium and potassium aspartate could be of safety concern because the margins of safety are considered too low. The Panel notes that if all sources would be used simultaneously, combined exposure will be 16 g/day (equivalent to 267 mg/kg bw/day), which is above the reported amounts inducing amino acid imbalance in intervention trials (6.3 g/day). Furthermore, this value is only 3 times lower than the NOAEL from the rat study and due to the low margin of safety the Panel considers this of safety concern. The Panel estimates that the exposure to aspartate from these food supplements should be added to the aspartate exposure arising from the diet.
Based on US data, estimates of the mean exposure to aspartic acid arising from the diet are 4.1 g/day (children 1-3 year old) to 9.3 g/day (males 19-30 year old) and at the 95th percentile 6.6 g/day (children 4-8 year old) to 12.9 g/day (males 19-50 year old). Under these conditions, estimates of maximum daily exposure to aspartate ions from the diet (13 g/day) and from calcium or magnesium aspartate supplements would be approximately 19 g/day6, and from potassium aspartate would be 17 g/day. Aspartate exposure estimates from zinc or copper supplementation would not significantly change aspartate exposure from the diet. 
Taken individually these levels of exposure are lower than those reported to induce amino acid imbalance in intervention trials, when aspartate exposure from the diet is also taken into consideration (19.3 g/day). However, when considering the potential total intake of aspartic ions arising from the diet and from a potential multi-mineral combination of all food supplements the exposure could add up to 29 g/day. In line with the SCF concerns, the Panel considers that the use of L-amino acids in food supplements should not give rise to a nutritional imbalance of the amino acids. Thus the Panel concludes that under these conditions aspartate ion exposure from a multi-mineral combination of this type could be of safety concern.

References

External links
Magnesium: Fact Sheet for Health Professionals
Magnesium: University of Maryland Medical Center
Micronutrient Information Center
Magnesium in the Diet

Magnesium compounds
Salts of carboxylic acids